New Mount Zigana Tunnel is a road tunnel under construction in the Black Sea Region of Turkey. Located on the provincial border of Gümüşhane and Trabzon, the tunnel will carry routes   between Torul, Gümüşhane in the south and Maçka, Trabzon in the north.

It is being built to bypass the  Zigana Pass and the current Zigana Tunnel.

References

Road tunnels in Turkey
Transport in Gümüşhane Province
Transport in Trabzon Province
Transport infrastructure  under construction in Turkey